This article includes a list of commercial recordings of the motets of Johann Sebastian Bach. Bach motets have often been recorded as a set (typically comprising the six motets catalogued as BWV225-230). However, other motets are attributed to Bach and there is some doubt about the authorship of Lobet den Herrn, alle Heiden, BWV 230, one of the BWV "six".

A single CD has the capacity to contain the set of six motets plus some other works. For example, Maasaki Suzuki's 2009 recording with the Bach Collegium Japan on BIS includes O Jesu Christ, meins Lebens Licht, BWV 118 (which at one time was categorised as a cantata) and Ich lasse dich nicht, BWV Anh. 159 (the authorship of which has been disputed). The motets chosen for a particular recording project can reflect the way the balance of opinion changes regarding the status of particular work: given Bach's status as one of the great composers, a firm attribution to him is likely to result in more interest in recording the piece in question. For example,  was not included by John Eliot Gardiner and the Monteverdi Choir in their first set recorded in 1980. However, they included it in their 2011 recording, by which time scholarly opinion had re-assessed the work.

Recordings have also been made of the less securely attributed and even spurious motets. For example, Wolfgang Helbich recorded The Apocryphal Bach Motets, sung by the Alsfelder Vokalensemble, in 1993 (released in 1994, re-issued 2014).

Types of choirs 
Choirs with one voice per part (OVPP) are used in some historically informed performances of Bach. However, OVPP recordings of the motets are in the minority. Exceptions include the Hilliard Ensemble's second set, and Konrad Junghänel with the group Cantus Cölln. Philippe Herreweghe's two sets use OVPP for some motets, for example Jesus meine Freude, and not others. 

At least some of the motets would have been first performed by singers from Leipzig's Thomanerchor, which comprises boys and young men. This choir has recorded the motets (initially under Günther Ramin in the 1950s), as have other choirs with boys' voices such as the Choir of New College, Oxford.

Instrumental accompaniment 
Music directors need to make choices about the instrumental accompaniment, if any, to be used. There are three possible approaches: 
a cappella, that is, without an accompaniment
instruments doubling the vocal lines, something which is described as playing colla parte 
Basso continuo, or just an organ accompaniment, to provide some instrumental support for the singers

Surviving sources do not make it clear what Bach's approach was to the accompaniment of most of these pieces. In the case of Der Geist hilft unser Schwachheit auf, BWV 226 orchestral parts are extant, indicating that choir I was doubled by strings and choir II by reeds (two oboes, taille and bassoon). There is also a basso continuo provided (separate violone and organ parts) which underlies both choirs.
An accompaniment is also specified for Lobet den Herrn.

La Petite Bande and Bach Collegium Japan, for example, use the orchestration of Der Geist hilft unser Schwachheit auf for the other pieces for double choir.
However, a capella performance is long-established tradition, which is also reflected in recordings. The Hilliard Ensemble's OVPP version is mainly a capella. They omit the instrumental parts of Der Geist hilft unser Schwachheit auf, but sing Lobet den Herrn to organ accompaniment.

The recordings with continuo accompaniment include The Sixteen's version (the instruments are cello, violone, theorbo, organ) and the second recording by the Monteverdi Choir (cello, double bass, bassoon and organ).

History 
The first of the motets to be recorded was Jesu meine Freude in 1927. This version was sung in English.

Awards 
In 2010, Suzuki and his ensemble were given a French award (Diapason d’Or de l’Année) and a German award (Preis der deutschen Schallplattenkritik) for their recording of Bach motets on BIS.
 
John Eliot Gardiner, who has won more Gramophone Awards than any other living artist, received one for his second recording of the motets with the Monteverdi Choir on SDG. It was one of the 2013 awards, the category being "Baroque Vocal".

Grete Pedersen with the Norwegian choir Det Norske Solistkor won a Diapason d'Or in 2018 for their recording of the motets on BIS.

Raphaël Pichon with Pygmalion won an Opus Klassik award in 2021 for their recording of the motets on Harmonia Mundi.

Discography 
Recorded sets of Bach's motets usually include at least the motets BWV 225-229. Motets have also been recorded individually, for instance Charles Kennedy Scott and the Bach Cantata Club recorded BWV 227, sung in English, in 1927, which was the first recording of any motet by Bach.

Sets
The intention has been to feature versions which are still available. The year given is that of recording. In the case of pre-1980s recordings, the date of reissue on CD can be significantly later than the original recording.

Individual motets
Sei Lob und Preis mit Ehren, BWV 28/2a (formerly BWV 231)

O Jesu Christ, meins Lebens Licht, BWV 118

Jesu, meine Freude, BWV 227

Tilge, Höchster, meine Sünden, BWV 1083

Der Gerechte kömmt um, BWV 1149

Ich lasse dich nicht, BWV Anh. 159

Jauchzet dem Herrn, alle Welt, BWV Anh. 160

Unser Wandel ist im Himmel, BWV Anh. 165

References

Sources 
 

Motets